The following are lists of prehistoric animals:

By type

Land and avian animals
List of prehistoric amphibian genera
List of prehistoric mammals
List of fossil bird genera
List of crurotarsan genera

Pterosaurs
List of pterosaur genera
List of informally named pterosaurs

Dinosaurs
List of dinosaur genera
List of informally named dinosaurs
List of dinosaur species on display
Lists of dinosaur specimens
List of non-avian dinosaur species preserved with evidence of feathers
List of fictional dinosaurs

By location
List of African dinosaurs
List of Asian dinosaurs
List of Australian and Antarctic dinosaurs
List of dinosaurs and other Mesozoic reptiles of New Zealand
List of European dinosaurs
List of Indian and Madagascan dinosaurs
List of North American dinosaurs
List of Appalachian dinosaurs
List of archosaurs of the Chinle Formation
List of dinosaurs of the Morrison Formation
List of South American dinosaurs

Marine animals

Corals
List of prehistoric hexacoral genera
List of prehistoric octocoral genera

Echinoderms
List of prehistoric echinoderm genera
List of prehistoric echinoid genera
List of crinoid genera
List of edrioasteroid genera
List of prehistoric starfish genera
List of prehistoric stylophoran genera

Fish
Lists of prehistoric fish
List of prehistoric bony fish genera
List of prehistoric cartilaginous fish genera
List of prehistoric jawless fish genera
List of acanthodian genera
List of conodont genera
List of placoderm genera

Other marine animals
List of chitinozoan genera
List of eurypterid genera
List of mosasaur genera
List of prehistoric annelid genera
List of prehistoric barnacles
List of prehistoric brittle stars
List of prehistoric bryozoan genera
List of prehistoric chitons
List of prehistoric foraminifera genera
List of ichthyosaur genera
List of marine gastropod genera in the fossil record
List of plesiosaur genera
List of prehistoric malacostracans
List of prehistoric medusozoan genera
List of prehistoric nautiloid genera
List of prehistoric ostracod genera
List of prehistoric sea cucumbers
List of prehistoric sponge genera
List of trilobite genera

By location
List of extinct animals of Romania
List of fossil species in the La Brea Tar Pits, California, United States
List of fossil species in the London Clay, England
List of White Sea biota species by phylum, Russia
Paleobiota of the Hell Creek Formation, northern United States
Paleobiota of the Morrison Formation, western United States

By period or other grouping
Largest prehistoric animals
List of Ediacaran genera
List of Late Quaternary prehistoric bird species
List of quaternary mammalian fauna of China
List of vertebrate fauna of the Maastrichtian stage

See also
Lists of extinct animals
List of transitional fossils
Palaeontology
Prehistory